Rosemary Lane may refer to:
Rosemary Lane (actress) (1914–1974), one of the Lane Sisters
Rosemary Lane (song), a British folk song
Rosemary Lane (album), a 1971 recording by Bert Jansch